The Tauranga Taupō River is a river of the Hawke's Bay and Waikato Regions of New Zealand's North Island.

See also
List of rivers of New Zealand

References

Rivers of the Hawke's Bay Region
Taupō District
Rivers of Waikato
Rivers of New Zealand
Tributaries of the Waikato River